Murray Selwyn Jones (born 1957 in Lower Hutt) is a New Zealand sailor.

Sailing career
Jones represented New Zealand in the Flying Dutchman class in 1988 and 1992 Summer Olympics. Jones finished 5th in 1988 and 4th in 1992, alongside Greg Knowles.

Jones was part of Team New Zealand that won the America's Cup in 1995 and then defended the trophy in 2000. Jones was one of six prominent sailors who then left Team New Zealand and joined Alinghi, winning the 2003 America's Cup and 2007 America's Cup. Jones was inducted into the America's Cup Hall of Fame in 2010.

Along with Russell Coutts, Jones later joined Oracle Team USA and was involved in the 2013 America's Cup victory.

Jones re-joined Team New Zealand for the 2017 America's Cup.

Personal life
Jones married Jan Shearer. His daughter, Gemma, is a sailor and competed in the 2016 Summer Olympics.

References

New Zealand male sailors (sport)
1957 births
Alinghi sailors
Team New Zealand sailors
Oracle Racing sailors
Living people
Olympic sailors of New Zealand
Sailors at the 1988 Summer Olympics – Flying Dutchman
Sailors at the 1992 Summer Olympics – Flying Dutchman
2010 America's Cup sailors
2007 America's Cup sailors
2003 America's Cup sailors
2000 America's Cup sailors
1995 America's Cup sailors